A sinker in mining in the 19th century was a worker who specialized in creating new vertical mine shafts.

The job was highly skilled and the workers who did this work were often regarded as an elite workforce.

References

Mining terminology